Kura Bolagh (also Romanized as Kūrā Bolāgh; also known as Kūr Bolāgh and Kūreh Bolagh) is a village in Hajjilar-e Jonubi Rural District, Hajjilar District, Chaypareh County, West Azerbaijan Province, Iran. At the 2006 census, its population was 100, in 14 families.

References 

Populated places in Chaypareh County